Killer Wave is a 2007 joint American-Canadian action-thriller TV mini-series,  directed by Canadian filmmaker Bruce McDonald and written by Tedi Sarafian, George Malko, William Gray.

Plot
The US east coast is suddenly struck by a type of a massive destructive force of nature usually only  happening  after a major earthquake in  the Pacific and Indian Ocean rims: tidal waves of the destructive tsunami type. Scientist and fiction author John McAdams is forced to attend a type of Department of Homeland Security conference which concludes the phenomenon must be man-made, quite possibly abusing the findings of John's secret former Sea Lion project, but leaves questions of who wants to and has the means unanswered. Indeed, John and his colleague Sophie, a Québécois, soon find John  set up for the murder of a potential whistleblower  and are pursued by The FBI, Maine State Police and a pair of foreign ruthless assassins. Major destruction means major contracts for construction and coastal defenses, so building tycoons like Victor Bannister certainly have a considerable interest. The movie is two part mini-series originally aired in The UK.

Cast
 Angus MacFadyen as John McAdams
 Karine Vanasse as Sophie Marleau
 John Robinson as Frank Brisick
 Tom Skerritt as  Victor Bannister
 Stephen McHattie as  Edgar Powell

Production
McDonald began the production under the company Muse Entertainment Enterprises in June 2006. Filming initially took place in Montreal and Nova Scotia. The action thriller was shot in just seven weeks in Montreal and one week on the ocean shore in Nova Scotia, until August 2006. The $9.6 (USD) million mini-series is a production of Muse Entertainment Enterprises. Killer Wave was produced by Irene Litinsky and Michael Prupas, as executive producer was Robert Halmi Sr. of RHI Entertainment in work.

Release
The international distributor is RHI International Distribution Inc. The Miniseries aired on 10 January 2007 in the United Kingdom and is available on streaming Netflix.

See also
Tidal Wave: No Escape, a 1997 American movie with a similar plot and identically-named villain.

References

External links

2000s American television miniseries
American action thriller films
2007 action thriller films
American disaster films
Films set in Montreal
Canadian action thriller films
English-language Canadian films
Films shot in Montreal
Films shot in Nova Scotia
2000s Canadian television miniseries
Films directed by Bruce McDonald
Television series by Muse Entertainment
2007 films
2000s American films
2000s Canadian films